Broodhagen is a surname. Notable people with the surname include:

Karl Broodhagen (1909–2002), Barbadian sculptor and painter
Virgil Broodhagen (born 1943), Barbadian painter